The Winter Egg is a Fabergé egg, one of a series of fifty-two jewelled Easter eggs created by Russian jeweler Peter Carl Fabergé. It was an Easter 1913 gift for Tsarina Maria Feodorovna from Tsar Nicholas II, who had a standing order of two Easter eggs every year, one for his mother and one for his wife. It was designed by Alma Pihl.

The price in 1913 was 24,700 rubles, the most expensive Easter egg ever made. The egg left Russia after the Revolution, and ended up in the collection of Mr. Brian Ledbrooke, Esq.  It was first sold at auction in 1994 at Christie's in Geneva for $5.6 million, the world record at that time for a Faberge item sold at auction. The egg sold for US$9.6 million in an auction at Christie's in New York City in 2002. It was reported that the buyer was Hamad bin Khalifa Al Thani, the Emir of Qatar.

Design
The exterior of the egg resembles frost and ice crystals formed on clear glass. It is studded with 1,660 diamonds, and is made from quartz, platinum, and orthoclase. The miniature surprise flower basket is studded with 1,378 diamonds and is made from platinum and gold, while the wood anemones are made of white quartz and the leaves are made of demantoid. The flowers lie in gold moss.

References

Sources

External links
Mieks Fabergé Eggs - 1913 Winter Egg

Imperial Fabergé eggs
1913 works